The Lady and the Mouse is a 1913 American short drama film directed by  D. W. Griffith. A print of the film survives. Lillian and Dorothy Gish play sisters in the film. The only other two films where the Gishes play sisters are An Unseen Enemy (1912) and Orphans of the Storm (1922).

Cast
 Lillian Gish as The Young Woman
 Lionel Barrymore as The Young Woman's Father
 Harry Hyde as The Rich Man / Tramp
 Dorothy Gish as The Sick Sister
 Kate Toncray as The Aunt
 Robert Harron as The Young Friend
 Adolph Lestina as The Doctor
 Henry B. Walthall as At Garden Party
 Viola Barry as At Garden Party
 J. Jiquel Lanoe as At Garden Party
 Mae Marsh as Undetermined Role (unconfirmed)
 Joseph McDermott as Creditor
 Frank Opperman as Creditor
 W. C. Robinson as Creditor

See also
 D. W. Griffith filmography
 Lillian Gish filmography
 Lionel Barrymore filmography

References

External links

1913 films
1913 drama films
1913 short films
American silent short films
American black-and-white films
Silent American drama films
Films directed by D. W. Griffith
1910s American films